Johann Sebastian Bach composed the church cantata  (What God does is well done), 99, in Leipzig for the 15th Sunday after Trinity and first performed it on 17 September 1724. The chorale cantata is based on the hymn "" by Samuel Rodigast (1674).

History and words 
Bach composed the cantata in his second year in Leipzig as part of his second annual cycle of chorale cantatas for the 15th Sunday after Trinity. The prescribed readings for the Sunday were from the Epistle to the Galatians, Paul's admonition to "walk in the Spirit", and from the Gospel of Matthew, from the Sermon on the Mount, the demand not to worry about material needs, but to seek God's kingdom first. The cantata text is based on the chorale "" (1674) by Samuel Rodigast, which is generally related to the Gospel. Bach used the chorale in several other cantatas, especially later in another chorale cantata, "". All six stanzas begin with the same line. An unknown author retained the text of the first and last stanza, but paraphrased the inner four stanzas to as many movements, even retaining some of the rhymes in the second movement. In the fourth movement, he refers to the Gospel, paraphrasing the last verse to "Even if every day has its particular trouble". He introduced references to the cross twice in the fifth movement, stressing the suffering of Jesus and his followers.

Bach first performed the cantata on 17 September 1724.

Scoring and structure 

The cantata in six movements is scored for four vocal soloists (soprano, alto, tenor and bass), a four-part choir, and a Baroque instrumental ensemble of horn, flauto traverso, oboe d'amore, two violins, viola and basso continuo.

 Chorale: 
 Recitative (bass): 
 Aria (tenor): 
 Recitative (alto): 
 Duet aria (soprano, alto): 
 Chorale:

Music 

The opening chorus is a distinct concerto movement. The strings open with a theme derived from the chorale melody. After 16 measures, a concertino of flute, oboe d'amore and violin I begins, with the oboe playing the theme introduced by the strings and the flute playing a virtuoso counterpoint. Three measures later, the voices enter, with the cantus firmus in the soprano, doubled by the horn. In the interlude following the Stollen of the bar form, all of the instruments participate in the concerto. The complete sequence is repeated for the second Stollen. For the Abgesang, Bach combines differently, now the strings and woods play tutti, and the flute appears as a solo, alternating with the oboe. Therefore, the instrumental postlude is not a repeat of the introduction, but a more complex combination. According to Julian Mincham, "this movement would still work perfectly well if the vocal parts were entirely removed."

The first secco recitative ends on a long coloratura on the last word "", or "turn", as in "can turn aside my misfortune". The first aria is accompanied by the flute, another work for an able flute player, following Was frag ich nach der Welt, BWV 94 and Nimm von uns, Herr, du treuer Gott, BWV 101, composed only a few weeks earlier. The text mentions "" (shudder); shaking and torment of the soul are pictured in virtuoso figuration, although the soul is asked not to shudder. The second recitative is similar to the first, ending on the last word "", or "appeareth", as in "when God's true loyal will appeareth". In the last aria, a duet, the strings are still silent, while the flute and oboe accompany the voices. The instruments begin with a ritornello, a trio with the continuo. After a first vocal section, a second section presents new material, but refers to the first section by a repeat of instrumental motifs from the first section and a complete repeat of the ritornello as a conclusion. The closing chorale is set for four parts.

Recordings 

 Die Bach Kantate Vol. 52, Helmuth Rilling, Gächinger Kantorei, Bach-Collegium Stuttgart, Arleen Augér, Helen Watts, Lutz-Michael Harder, John Bröcheler, Hänssler 1979
 J. S. Bach: Das Kantatenwerk – Sacred Cantatas Vol. 5, Nikolaus Harnoncourt, Tölzer Knabenchor,  Concentus Musicus Wien, soloist of the Tölzer Knabenchor, Paul Esswood, Kurt Equiluz, Philippe Huttenlocher, Teldec 1979
 Bach Edition Vol. 8 – Cantatas Vol. 3, Pieter Jan Leusink, Holland Boys Choir, Netherlands Bach Collegium, Ruth Holton, Sytse Buwalda, Knut Schoch, Bas Ramselaar, Brilliant Classics 1999
 J. S. Bach: Complete Cantatas Vol. 12, Ton Koopman, Amsterdam Baroque Orchestra & Choir, Lisa Larsson, Annette Markert, Christoph Prégardien, Klaus Mertens, Antoine Marchand 2000
 Bach Cantatas Vol. 8: Bremen / Santiago / For the 15th Sunday after Trinity / For the 16th Sunday after Trinity, John Eliot Gardiner, Monteverdi Choir, English Baroque Soloists, Malin Hartelius, William Towers, James Gilchrist, Peter Harvey, Soli Deo Gloria 2000
 J. S. Bach: Cantatas Vol. 25 – Cantatas from Leipzig 1724, Masaaki Suzuki, Bach Collegium Japan, Yukari Nonoshita, Daniel Taylor, Makoto Sakurada, Peter Kooij, BIS 2003

References

Sources 

 
 Was Gott tut, das ist wohlgetan BWV 99; BC A 133 / Chorale cantata (15th Sunday after Trinity) Bach Digital
 Cantata BWV 99 Was Gott tut, das ist wohlgetan: history, scoring, sources for text and music, translations to various languages, discography, discussion, Bach Cantatas Website
 BWV 99 Was Gott tut, das ist wohlgetan: English translation, University of Vermont
 BWV 99 Was Gott tut, das ist wohlgetan: text, scoring, University of Alberta
 Luke Dahn: BWV 99.6 bach-chorales.com

External links 

Was Gott tut, das ist wohlgetan, BWV 99: performance by the Netherlands Bach Society (video and background information)

Church cantatas by Johann Sebastian Bach
1724 compositions
Chorale cantatas